Richard Davison (1796 – 20 February 1869) was a Belfast solicitor and Conservative politician.

Davison was Member of Parliament (MP) for Belfast from 1852 to 1860, when he resigned his seat. A defender of the established church in Ireland, in 1863 Davison read a paper 'On the present position of the Irish Church' to the 5th annual conference of the united dioceses of Down, Connor and Dromore.

References

External links 

1796 births
1869 deaths
UK MPs 1852–1857
UK MPs 1857–1859
UK MPs 1859–1865
Irish Conservative Party MPs
Members of the Parliament of the United Kingdom for Belfast constituencies (1801–1922)
Politicians from Belfast